Julebygda Chapel is a parish church of the Church of Norway in the large Sandnes municipality in Rogaland county, Norway. It is located in the borough of Malmheim og Soma in the western part of city of Sandnes which lies in the far western part of the municipality. It is one of the two churches for the Gand parish which is part of the Sandnes prosti (deanery) in the Diocese of Stavanger. The stone church was constructed in a long church design in 1957 using designs by the architect Valdemar Scheel Hansteen. The church seats about 200 people.

Media gallery

See also
List of churches in Rogaland

References

Sandnes
Churches in Rogaland
Stone churches in Norway
20th-century Church of Norway church buildings
Churches completed in 1957
1957 establishments in Norway